Idelalisib, sold under the brand name Zydelig, is a medication used to treat certain blood cancers.

The substance acts as a phosphoinositide 3-kinase inhibitor; more specifically, it blocks P110δ, the delta isoform of the enzyme phosphoinositide 3-kinase. It was developed by Gilead Sciences.  Idelalisib had annual sales of $168 million (USD) during the year of 2016, up from $132 million (USD) in 2015.

Medical uses
Idelalisib is a second-line drug for patients whose chronic lymphocytic leukemia (CLL) has relapsed. Used in combination with rituximab, idelalisib is to be used in patients for whom rituximab alone would be considered appropriate therapy due to other existing medical conditions. It appears to be effective and leads to improvement of lymphadenopathy and splenomegaly. However, the lymphocyte counts take longer to decrease to normal levels with idelalisib. It is not recommended as a first-line treatment.

It is also approved for the treatment of follicular B-cell non-Hodgkin lymphoma (FL) and relapsed small lymphocytic lymphoma (SLL), both in patients who have received at least two prior systemic therapies.

Adverse effects
Clinical symptoms include diarrhea, fever, fatigue, nausea, cough, pneumonia, abdominal pain, chills and rash. Laboratory abnormalities may include: neutropenia, hypertriglyceridemia, hyperglycemia and elevated levels of liver enzymes. Idelalisib's safety and effectiveness to treat relapsed FL and relapsed SLL were established in a clinical trial with 123 participants with slow-growing (indolent) non-Hodgkin lymphomas. All participants were treated with idelalisib and were evaluated for complete or partial disappearance of their cancer after treatment (objective response rate, or ORR). Results showed 54% of participants with relapsed FL and 58% of participants with SLL experienced ORR.

The U.S. label for idelalisib has a boxed warning describing toxicities that can be serious and fatal, including liver toxicity, severe diarrhea, colon inflammation, lung tissue inflammation (pneumonitis) and intestinal perforation, and the manufacturer was required to put in place a Risk Evaluation and Mitigation Strategy (REMS) under which the risk of toxicities would be managed.

In March 2016, as reports were made from three ongoing clinical trials of serious adverse events and deaths, mostly due to infections, the European Medicines Agency opened a review of the drug and its risks. On March 21, 2016 Gilead Sciences (the manufacturer of idelalisib) alerted healthcare providers about decreased overall survival and increased risk of serious infections in patients with CLL and indolent non-Hodgkin lymphoma (iNHL) treated with idelalisib. The company also disclosed that it stopped six clinical trials in patients with CLL, SLL and iNHL due to an increased rate of adverse events, including deaths. In 2016, the EMA recommended that people on idelalisib should be given medication against the lung infection Pneumocystis jirovecii pneumonia and this should be continued for up to 6 months after idelalisib has stopped. In addition, people should be monitored for signs of infection.

Pharmacology

Mechanism of action
PI3Kδ is expressed in normal and malignant B-cells. By inhibiting it, idelalisib induces apoptosis and prevents proliferation in cell lines derived from malignant B-cells and in primary tumor cells. It also inhibits several cell signaling pathways, including B-cell receptor (BCR) signaling and the CXCR4 and CXCR5 signaling, which are involved in the trafficking and homing of B-cells to the lymph nodes and bone marrow. Idelalisib reduces the levels of CD20 on the surface of malignant B lymphocytes by interfering with the IL4-STAT6, which might explain some of its repressive effects on the biology of B cells, but also impair its efficacy in combination with anti-CD20 antibodies (rituximab, ofatumumab etc.).

Binding profile
Idelalisib is a competitive inhibitor of the ATP binding site of the PI3Kδ catalytic domain. Its in vitro potency and selectivity relative to the other Class I PI3K isoforms is the following:

History

Regulatory
In July 2014, the FDA and EMA granted idelalisib approval to treat different types of leukemia. The FDA is also granted approval for idelalisib to treat patients with relapsed follicular B-cell non-Hodgkin lymphoma and relapsed small lymphocytic lymphoma. Idelalisib is intended to be used in patients who have received at least two prior systemic therapies.

References

External links 
 

Antineoplastic drugs
Breakthrough therapy
CYP3A4 inhibitors
Phosphoinositide 3-kinase inhibitors
Purines
Fluoroarenes